Timothy Peter Johnson (born December 28, 1946) is a retired American lawyer and politician who served as a United States senator from South Dakota from 1997 to 2015. Johnson chose not to seek reelection in 2014. , he is the last Democrat to have represented South Dakota in Congress, and the last to hold any statewide office in the state.

Early life, education and legal career
Johnson was born in Canton, South Dakota, the son of Ruth Jorinda (née Ljostveit) and Vandel Charles Johnson. He has Norwegian, Swedish and Danish ancestry. Raised in Vermillion, Johnson earned a B.A. in 1969 and an M.A. in 1970 from the University of South Dakota, where he was a member of the Delta Tau Delta fraternity.

After doing post-graduate studies at Michigan State University from 1970 to 1971, a period during which he worked for the Michigan Senate, Johnson returned to Vermillion to attend the University of South Dakota School of Law and earned his J.D. in 1975; immediately after earning his juris doctor, he went into private practice. He did not take the bar exam as he was admitted to the South Dakota bar under the state's diploma privilege.

Early political career
Johnson served in the South Dakota House of Representatives from 1979 to 1982 and in the South Dakota Senate from 1983 to 1986. Johnson served as Clay County deputy state's attorney in 1985 during his tenure in the South Dakota Senate. During his first term, he introduced more legislation than any other freshman member of the House. Between 1991 and 1994, he served as a regional whip for the Democratic Party. He left the House in 1997, when he took up his newly acquired Senate seat.

United States Senate

Committee assignments
Committee on Appropriations
Subcommittee on Agriculture, Rural Development, Food and Drug Administration, and Related Agencies
Subcommittee on Energy and Water Development
Subcommittee on Interior, Environment, and Related Agencies
Subcommittee on Military Construction and Veterans' Affairs, and Related Agencies (Chairman)
Subcommittee on State, Foreign Operations, and Related Programs
Subcommittee on Transportation, Housing and Urban Development, and Related Agencies
Committee on Banking, Housing, and Urban Affairs (Chairman)
Subcommittee on Housing, Transportation, and Community Development
Subcommittee on Financial Institutions
Subcommittee on Securities, Insurance and Investment
Committee on Energy and Natural Resources
Subcommittee on Public Lands and Forests
Subcommittee on Water and Power
Committee on Indian Affairs

Political positions

Infrastructure
During his tenure in Congress, Johnson supported infrastructure projects that delivered clean drinking water to communities throughout South Dakota and into surrounding states. He authored several water project bills, resulting in clean drinking water being delivered to hundreds of thousands of South Dakota families.

During his first term in the House of Representatives, Congressman Tim Johnson authored the Mni Wiconi Project Act of 1988  (H.R. 2772, enacted into law as Public Law 100–516).  The measure authorized construction of a water project serving an area of southwestern South Dakota that included the Pine Ridge Indian Reservation, an area that had long suffered low water supplies and poor water quality. In subsequent years, Johnson authored legislation (H.R. 3954) to expand the Mni Wiconi Rural Water Project service area, and the expansion was incorporated into a broader bill and enacted as Public Law 103-434.

Johnson's Mid Dakota Rural Water System Act of 1991  (H.R. 616) was incorporated into a larger package of infrastructure projects and enacted into law as  Public Law 102-575 . The Mid Dakota Rural Water Project was completed in 2006 and serves more than 30,000 residents of east-central South Dakota.

The Fall River Rural Water Users District Rural Water System Act of 1998 (S. 744 in the 105th Congress, enacted as Public Law 105–352) authorized the Bureau of Reclamation to construct a rural water system in Fall River County of South Dakota. After years of drought, residents in the southeastern area of that county had been left without a suitable water supply, and many of them were forced to either haul water or use bottled water because of poor water quality. 

The Lewis and Clark Rural Water System Act of 1999 (S.244 in the 106th Congress) authorized construction of a water delivery system spanning a broad area of southeastern South Dakota, northwestern Iowa, and southwestern Minnesota. The system joined 22 rural water systems and communities.

The authorized project was intended to bring clean, safe drinking water to 180,000 individuals  throughout the Lewis and Clark service region. The Perkins County Rural Water System Act (S.2117 in the 105th Congress and S.243 in the 106th Congress, enacted as Public Law 106–136) authorized the Bureau of Reclamation to construct a rural water system in Perkins County of South Dakota, serving approximately 2,500 residents including the communities of Lemmon and Bison.

Agriculture
Johnson worked to enact a requirement that meat and other agricultural products be labeled for country of origin. Having first authored legislation addressing the issue in 1992 (H.R. 5855 ), Johnson continued the fight until a meat labeling law was enacted in 2002 as part of the Farm Bill reauthorization  (Public Law 107–171).  The enacted law contained language Johnson had introduced as S. 280  earlier that Congress. 

For more than a decade, executive branch opposition and legal challenges delayed implementation of the labeling law. 

In May 2007, Johnson received an Honored Cooperator award from the National Cooperative Business Association (NCBA) for his support of cooperative businesses.

In 2013, the National Farmers Union presented Johnson with its Friend of the Family Farmer award, an honor intended to recognize his commitment to helping small scale family farms remain viable.

Tourism
Johnson authored the bill  establishing the Minuteman Missile National Historic Site in western South Dakota.  The measure was enacted as Public Law 106–115, creating a new unit of the National Park System.  At the Minuteman Missile National Historic Site, visitors can learn about the Cold War, and the nuclear missiles that threatened massive destruction while also serving as a deterrent to war.

Defense
Johnson was the only seated member of Congress to have a son or daughter serving in the active duty military when the Senate voted to approve the use of force in Iraq.  Johnson's oldest son, Brooks, served in the Army's 101st Airborne Division, which would surely be mobilized to fight in Iraq.  Johnson ultimately voted to permit the use of force, and his son served in Iraq, having already served in other conflicts in Bosnia and Kosovo. Brooks Johnson later also served in the conflict in Afghanistan.

As Chairman of the Senate Appropriations Subcommittee on Military Construction and Veterans Affairs, Johnson secured full and timely funding for veterans' health care for the first time in 21 years. He was among a group of legislators that successfully pressed for enactment of legislation providing advance funding for veterans' health care , thereby preventing health services for veterans from being undermined by funding delays.

When the Base Realignment and Closure (BRAC) Commission recommended closure of Ellsworth Air Force Base, Johnson assisted in making the South Dakota delegation's case to keep the base open. Ultimately, the base was preserved by an 8 to 1 vote of the BRAC commission.

Banking
As Chairman of the Senate Banking Committee, Johnson pressed for confirmation and ultimately brought President Obama's nominee for CFPB chairman, Richard Cordray, to a committee vote despite Republican opposition.

The committee approved Cordray's nomination on a party-line 12-10 vote, and Cordray was ultimately confirmed by the full Senate on a 66-34 vote.

Other
In the House, Johnson was among the minority of his party to vote in favor of the Personal Responsibility and Work Opportunity Reconciliation Act of 1996a welfare reform bill and another bill to repeal the Federal Assault Weapons Ban. He was among the minority of Democrats to vote for President George W. Bush's 2001 tax cut. On January 31, 2006, Johnson was one of only four Democrats to vote to confirm Judge Samuel Alito to the U.S. Supreme Court. He has also called for "broadened use" of the death penalty.

Johnson was, however, among the minority of senators to vote against the Unborn Victims of Violence Act, which was strongly supported by anti-abortion groups. While a member of the House, he was one of only 16 congressmen to vote against the Telecom Act of 1996, which provided for deregulation and competition in the communication sector and was given firm support by Republicans, business groups, and most Democrats.

Johnson supported Obama's health reform legislation; he voted for the Patient Protection and Affordable Care Act in December 2009, and he voted for the Health Care and Education Reconciliation Act of 2010.

The act would allow the continuation of grazing and hunting on the land and would create the first national grassland wilderness in the country.

On December 18, 2010, Johnson voted in favor of the Don't Ask, Don't Tell Repeal Act of 2010.

Health
Johnson was treated for prostate cancer in 2004 and further tests showed that he was clear of the disease.

On December 13, 2006, while in Washington, DC, during the broadcast of a live radio interview with WNAX radio, Johnson suffered bleeding in the brain caused by a cerebral arteriovenous malformation, a congenital defect that causes enlarged and tangled blood vessels. In critical condition, he underwent surgery at George Washington University Hospital to drain the blood and stop further bleeding.

Johnson then underwent a lengthy regimen of physical, occupational, and speech therapy to regain strength and mobility and restore his severely affected speech. In his 2007 State of the Union Address, President George W. Bush sent Johnson his best wishes.

Johnson returned to his full schedule in the Senate on September 5, 2007, to both tributes and standing ovations.

Political campaigns
Johnson narrowly defeated three-term Senator Larry Pressler (R) in the 1996 U.S. Senate election, making him the only Senate candidate that year to defeat an incumbent in a general election, in a year that saw thirteen open seats. In 2002, he defeated his successor in the at-large House seat, U.S. Representative John Thune (R), by 524 votes to win reelection. Johnson's reelection race was widely seen as a proxy battle between President George W. Bush, who had carried South Dakota comfortably in 2000, and the state's senior Senator and Johnson's fellow Democrat, Senate Majority Leader Tom Daschle, who subsequently ran for reelection in 2004 and lost to Thune. In his 2002 election, Johnson won 94 percent of the vote among the Oglala Sioux, South Dakota's biggest tribe.

2008

Johnson ran for reelection in 2008. While he was recovering earlier in the campaign season, fellow Democratic senators raised funds for his campaign. Early polls showed Johnson likely to beat the Republican challenger, Joel Dykstra, which he did, with 62.5% of the vote. In January 2008, Johnson endorsed Barack Obama for president in the Democratic primary.

Electoral history

*Write-in and minor candidate notes: In 1992, Ann Balakier received 2,780 votes.

Personal life
Tim is the second son of Van, a noted educator, and Ruth, a homemaker, Johnson. His older brother is Thomas Johnson, MD of Yankton, SD, and his younger sister is Julie Johnson Spencer of Armeda, MI.  Tim is a graduate of Vermillion High School.

The Johnsons have three children Brooks of Millis, MA, Brendan, and Kelsey Billion of Sioux Falls, SD. They have eight grandchildren. Their home is in Sioux Falls, SD.

References

External links

 

|-

|-

|-

|-

1946 births
American people of Danish descent
American Lutherans
American people of Norwegian descent
American people of Swedish descent
American prosecutors
Democratic Party members of the United States House of Representatives from South Dakota
Democratic Party United States senators from South Dakota
Living people
Democratic Party members of the South Dakota House of Representatives
Michigan State University alumni
People from Canton, South Dakota
People from Vermillion, South Dakota
Politicians from Sioux Falls, South Dakota
South Dakota lawyers
Democratic Party South Dakota state senators
University of South Dakota alumni
University of South Dakota School of Law alumni
21st-century American politicians
Members of the United States House of Representatives from South Dakota